Polanka or Polánka may refer to places:

Czech Republic
Polánka, a municipality and village in the Plzeň Region
Polánka, a village and part of Chotoviny in the South Bohemian Region
Polánka, a village and part of Kasejovice in the Plzeň Region
Polánka, a village and part of Krásné (Chrudim District) in the Pardubice Region
Polánka, a village and part of Malešov in the Central Bohemian Region
Polánka, a village and part of Vlašim in the Central Bohemian Region

Poland
Polanka, Lower Silesian Voivodeship (south-west Poland)
Polanka, Lesser Poland Voivodeship (south Poland)
Polanka, Masovian Voivodeship (east-central Poland)
Polanka Wielka, seat of the Gmina Polanka Wielka